Xiaochun He is a high-energy nuclear physicist and Regent's Professor at Georgia State University. He is also a member of the PHENIX Collaboration, a research group at Brookhaven National Laboratory's Relativistic Heavy Ion Collider.

References

External links
Faculty profile

Living people
Georgia State University faculty
University of Tennessee alumni
Chinese nuclear physicists
Northwestern University alumni
Brookhaven National Laboratory staff
Year of birth missing (living people)